Morris from America  is a 2016 coming-of-age comedy-drama film written and directed by Chad Hartigan, produced by Martin Heisler, Sara Murphy, Adele Romanski, and Gabriele Simon, and starring Craig Robinson, Markees Christmas, Carla Juri, Lina Keller, and Jakub Gierszał. The film follows a 13-year-old American boy who dreams of becoming a rapper in an EDM-dominated Germany.

It was shown in the U.S. Dramatic Competition section at the 2016 Sundance Film Festival, where Hartigan won the Waldo Salt Screenwriting Award. The film was released on July 7, 2016, through DirecTV Cinema prior to opening in a limited release on August 19, 2016, by A24.

Plot
A coming-of-age adventure story of a 13-year-old American boy Morris who is currently living in Germany with his father Curtis, a soccer coach. Mo faces rejection from his peer group, finds himself impinged on boundaries of trust with his language tutor, romantic infatuation and drug use, finds niche in his rapping skills, learns to accept unexpected and odd experiences without taxing himself. His father also struggles to fit in with German culture and tries to be a stand up man for his son while grieving for his recently dead wife. He does what can be done best at the given time for making a better environment for Mo to grow up.

Cast
 Craig Robinson as Curtis Gentry
 Markees Christmas as Morris "Mo" Gentry
 Carla Juri as Inka
 Lina Keller as Katrin
 Jakub Gierszał as Per
 Levin Henning as Bastian
 Leon Badenhop as Rainer
 Marie Loschhorn as Birgit
 Patrick Güldenberg as Sven
 Josephine Becker as Nadine
 Eva Löbau as Katrin's Mother

Production
In July 2015, it was announced that Chad Hartigan would be directing a film from a screenplay he wrote. It was also announced that Craig Robinson, Carla Juri, and Markees Christmas, Lina Keller, Jakub Gierszal, Eva Löbau and Levin Henning had all been cast in the film, with Christmas portraying the role of an American boy moving to Germany, with Robinson portraying his father, and Juri portraying the role of his tutor. It was also announced that Lichtblick Media GMBH and Beachside Films would be  co-producing the film, which is being produced by Sara Murphy, Adele Romanski, Martin Heisler and Gabriele Simon, executive producing are Michael B. Clark and Alex Turtletaub.

Release
The film had its world premiere at the 2016 Sundance Film Festival on January 22, 2016. Shortly after, A24 acquired U.S distribution rights to the film. The film was released on DirecTV Cinema on July 7, 2016, prior to opening in a limited release on August 19, 2016.

Reception

Critical response
Morris From America received positive reviews from film critics. It holds an 87% rating on review aggregator website Rotten Tomatoes, based on 86 reviews, with an average rating of 7.1/10. The site's consensus reads, "Morris from America adds some novel narrative twists to its father-son story -- and gains added resonance thanks to a powerful performance from Craig Robinson." On Metacritic the film has a score of 75 out of 100 score, based on 29 critics, indicating "generally favorable reviews".

Justin Chang of Variety.com gave the film a positive review writing "Set to the pulsing hip-hop music that fuels Morris’ dreams and offers him refuge in a place that can seem friendly and threatening by turns, this coming-of-age dramedy explores how the challenges of being young, black and misunderstood can be compounded in a foreign environment, but goes about it in a grounded, character-driven way that never smacks of manipulation or special pleading." Eric Kohn of Indiewire.com gave the film a B+ writing : "Morris From America excels at conveying the inherent power of companionship in a largely indifferent world. When Curtis asserts that he and his son are 'the only two brothers in Heidelberg,' it's the movie's coziest moment."

Accolades

References

External links
 
 

2016 films
2016 independent films
2016 comedy-drama films
2010s hip hop films
A24 (company) films
American comedy-drama films
Films scored by Keegan DeWitt
Films set in Germany
Films set in Heidelberg
Films about grieving
Films about immigration to Germany
Films about parenting
Films about widowhood
English-language German films
German comedy-drama films
2010s German-language films
2010s English-language films
2016 multilingual films
American multilingual films
German multilingual films
2010s American films
2010s German films